Saurauia leucocarpa is a species of plant in the Actinidiaceae family. It is endemic to Mexico.

References

leucocarpa
Endemic flora of Mexico
Vulnerable plants
Taxonomy articles created by Polbot
Trees of Mexico
Cloud forest flora of Mexico